Hippodamia lunatomaculata, the crescent lady beetle, is a species of lady beetle in the family Coccinellidae. It is found in North America.

Subspecies
These two subspecies belong to the species Hippodamia lunatomaculata:
 Hippodamia lunatomaculata dobzhanskyi Chapin, 1946
 Hippodamia lunatomaculata lunatomaculata Motschulsky, 1845

References

Further reading

 

Coccinellidae
Articles created by Qbugbot
Beetles described in 1845